Polar Resources Ice Mining Experiment-1 (PRIME-1) is a NASA Lunar project, initially expected to launch and be deployed in December 2022, but has been postponed to June 2023.

PRIME-1 will be the first on-site resource utilization demonstration on Earth's Moon. Additionally, for the first time, NASA will robotically sample and analyze for ice from below the surface. Two components make up PRIME-1, both of which will be mounted to a commercial lunar lander:

 The Regolith and Ice Drill for Exploring New Terrain (TRIDENT): TRIDENT will drill up to three feet deep, extracting lunar regolith, or soil, up to the surface. The instrument can drill in multiple segments, pausing and retracting to deposit cuttings on the surface after each depth increment.

 Mass Spectrometer observing lunar operations (MSolo): This modified-for-spaceflight, commercial-off-the-shelf mass spectrometer will evaluate the drill cuttings for water and other chemical compounds. Soil samples from multiple depths will be analyzed.

PRIME-1 will launch as part of the Commercial Lunar Payload Services (CLPS) program, on the Nova-C IM-2 mission.

References 

Missions to the Moon